Ottam is a 2019 Indian Malayalam-language film directed by Zam and scripted by Rajesh K Narayan. The film features debutants Nandu Anand and Roshan Ullas in lead roles along with Renu Soundar, Madhuri Dileep, Manikandan R. Achari, Alencier Ley Lopez, Kalabhavan Shajohn, Rohini, 
Sudheer Karamana, Thesni Khan and Rajesh Sharma.

Plot
Set in Trivandrum, the story of Ottam unfolds in a day, and progresses through the lives of two youngsters - Abhi (Nandu Anand) and Vinay (Roshan Ullas). What does destiny have in store for these young men?

Cast
 Nandu Anand as Abhi
 Roshan Ullas as Vinay
 Renu Soundar as Mariya
 Madhuri Dileep
 Manikandan R. Achari as Kattu
 Alencier Ley Lopez as Chachappan
 Kalabhavan Shajohn 
 Rohini as Sara
 Sudheer Karamana
 Althaf
 Thesni Khan as Rejina 
 Rajesh Sharma as Suni

References

External links

2019 films
2010s Malayalam-language films